Chris Dickinson may refer to:

Chris Dickinson (footballer) (born 1994), English footballer
Chris Dickinson (wrestler) (born 1987), American wrestler